Janovice v Podještědí is a municipality and village in Liberec District in the Liberec Region of the Czech Republic. It has about 90 inhabitants.

History
The first written mention of Janovice v Podještědí is from 1518.

References

External links

Villages in Liberec District